Carlos Manuel de Oliveira Magalhães (born 25 February 1974), known as Litos, is a Portuguese retired professional footballer who played as a central defender.

He appeared in 226 Primeira Liga matches (21 goals) over nine seasons, mainly for Boavista with whom he won the 2001 national championship. He also spent several years in La Liga with Málaga.

Club career
Born in Porto, Litos started playing football with S.C. Campomaiorense. After a small stint with Boavista FC – in which youth system he grew – and moves to G.D. Estoril Praia and Rio Ave FC, he rejoined Boavista, being instrumental in the northern club's only Primeira Liga title in its history in 2000–01, as captain; he formed a formidable stopper duo with Pedro Emanuel, who would then move to FC Porto.

After Boavista's conquest, Litos signed for La Liga side Málaga CF, experiencing different fortunes during his spell in Andalusia – two seasons as an undisputed starter, a total of 20 games in the other three. In 2005–06 his team was relegated, with the player only making eight league appearances; for five years, he partnered compatriots Edgar and Duda.

Litos joined Académica de Coimbra for 2006–07. After being first choice in his first year he was deemed surplus to requirements in the following, leaving and moving to Austrian Football Bundesliga's SV Salzburg in January 2008; he retired at the end of that campaign, with no competitive matches to his credit.

International career
Litos earned six caps for Portugal, the first arriving on 10 February 1999 as he played three minutes in a 0–0 friendly draw against the Netherlands in Paris. He also represented the nation at the 1996 Summer Olympics.

Honours
Boavista
Primeira Liga: 2000–01
Taça de Portugal: 1996–97
Supertaça Cândido de Oliveira: 1997

Málaga
UEFA Intertoto Cup: 2002

References

External links

1974 births
Living people
Portuguese footballers
Footballers from Porto
Association football defenders
Primeira Liga players
Liga Portugal 2 players
Boavista F.C. players
S.C. Campomaiorense players
G.D. Estoril Praia players
Rio Ave F.C. players
Associação Académica de Coimbra – O.A.F. players
La Liga players
Málaga CF players
FC Red Bull Salzburg players
Portugal youth international footballers
Portugal under-21 international footballers
Portugal international footballers
Footballers at the 1996 Summer Olympics
Olympic footballers of Portugal
Portuguese expatriate footballers
Expatriate footballers in Spain
Expatriate footballers in Austria
Portuguese expatriate sportspeople in Spain
Portuguese expatriate sportspeople in Austria